Agriphila beieri is a species of moth in the family Crambidae described by Stanisław Błeszyński in 1953. It is found on Crete and Cyprus, as well as in Russia, Turkey, Syria, Iraq and Iran.

Subspecies
Agriphila beieri beieri
Agriphila beieri josifovi Ganev, 1985 (Turkey)

Taxonomy
The species is sometimes treated as a subspecies of Agriphila tolli.

References

Moths described in 1953
Crambini
Moths of Europe
Moths of Asia